Sarah Brosnan is a researcher studying the development of cognitive processes that underlie cooperation and reciprocity. The focus of her work has been on how animals perceive "exchanged goods and services," as demonstrated by reciprocal interactions,. She has looked at both human and nonhuman primates as a way of understanding the evolution of cooperative and economic behaviors, specifically  the topic of inequity aversion and the cooperative pulling paradigm. She works at Georgia State University in the Department of Psychology, and directs the university's Comparative Economics and Behavioral Studies Laboratory (CEBUS Lab).

Selected publications

See also 
 Inequity aversion
 Inequity aversion in animals
 Social inequity aversion

References 

American women psychologists
21st-century American psychologists
Ethologists
Human evolution theorists
Women primatologists
Primatologists
Georgia State University faculty
Year of birth missing (living people)
Place of birth missing (living people)
Living people
Behavioral economists
American women academics
21st-century American women